Hildegard Krekel (2 June 1952 – 26 May 2013) was a German actress. She was best known for playing the role of Rita in the television series Ein Herz und eine Seele.

Selected filmography

References

External links

 

1952 births
2013 deaths
Actors from Cologne
German film actresses
German television actresses
German voice actresses
20th-century German actresses
21st-century German actresses
Deaths from cancer in Germany